Portrait is the title of a recording by American folk music artist Doc Watson, released in 1987.

Guests include Jerry Douglas, Sam Bush and Mark O'Connor.

Track listing
 "I'm Worried Now" – 2:13
 "Nobody Knows But Me" (Elsie McWilliams, Jimmie Rodgers) – 3:40
 "Leaving London" (Tom Paxton) – 3:48
 "Stay in the Middle of the Road" (Traditional) – 2:33
 "Risin' Sun Blues" (Traditional) – 4:11
 "George Gudger's Overalls" (Lawrence Hammond) – 3:20
 "Tucker's Barn" (Traditional) – 2:08
 "Storms on the Ocean" (A. P. Carter) – 3:31
 "Prayer Bells of Heaven" (Traditional) – 2:25
 "Tough Luck Man" (Clarence Ashley) – 2:45
 "She's Gone Away" (William Smith) – 2:43
 "Country Blues" (Dock Boggs) – 3:24
 "Blue Eyed Jane" (Jimmie Rodgers, Lulu Belle White) – 3:00

Personnel
Doc Watson – guitar, banjo, harmonica, autoharp, vocals
T. Michael Coleman – bass, harmony vocals
Sam Bush – fiddle, mandolin
Mark O'Connor – fiddle
Jerry Douglas – dobro
Alan O'Bryant – guitar, harmony vocals
Pat McInerney – percussion
Mike Compton – harmony vocals
Pat Enright – harmony vocals
Mark Hembree – harmony vocals
Jack Lawrence – guitar
Production notes
Produced by T. Michael Coleman and Doc Watson
Engineered by Bill Vorn Dick
Mastered by James Lloyd

References

External links
 Doc Watson discography

1987 albums
Doc Watson albums
Sugar Hill Records albums